Sheepy Fields is a  biological Site of Special Scientific Interest north of Sheepy Magna in Leicestershire.

The two hay meadows in this site are on post-glacial river terrace deposits. There are diverse herbs such as lady's mantle, adder's tongue, hayrattle, pepper saxifrage, bulbous buttercup and cowslip.

The site is private land with no public access.

References

Sites of Special Scientific Interest in Leicestershire